Septicemic plague is one of the three forms of plague, and is caused by Yersinia pestis, a gram-negative species of bacterium. Septicemic plague is a systemic disease involving infection of the blood, and is most commonly spread by bites from infected fleas. Septicemic plague can cause disseminated intravascular coagulation, and is always fatal when untreated. The other varieties of the plague are bubonic plague and pneumonic plague.

Signs and symptoms 
The usual symptoms are:
 Abdominal pain
 Bleeding under skin due to blood clotting problems
 Bleeding from mouth, nose or rectum
 Gastrointestinal symptoms, including nausea, vomiting, which can be with blood, and diarrhea
 Fever
 Chills
 Low blood pressure
 Organ failure
 Shock
 Death of tissue (gangrene) in extremities, mostly fingers, nose, and toes
 Difficulty breathing

These symptoms are common to many human illnesses, and are not considered, in and of themselves, to signify infection with any form of plague.

It is important to note that septicemic plague may be asymptomatic, and may cause death absent of any symptoms.

Cause

Transmission 

Human Yersinia infections most commonly result from the bite of an infected flea or occasionally an infected mammal, but like most bacterial systemic diseases, the disease may be transmitted through an opening in the skin or by inhaling infectious droplets of moisture from sneezes or coughs. In both cases septicemic plague need not be the result, and in particular, not the initial result, but it occasionally happens that bubonic plague for example leads to infection of the blood, and septicemic plague results. If the bacteria happen to enter the bloodstream rather than the lymph or lungs, they multiply in the blood, causing bacteremia and severe sepsis. In septicemic plague, bacterial endotoxins cause disseminated intravascular coagulation (DIC), where tiny blood clots form throughout the body, commonly resulting in localised ischemic necrosis, tissue death from lack of circulation and perfusion.

DIC results in depletion of the body's clotting resources, so that it can no longer control bleeding. Consequently, the unclotted blood bleeds into the skin and other organs, leading to red or black patchy rash and to hematemesis (vomiting blood) or hemoptysis (coughing up blood). The rash may cause bumps on the skin that look somewhat like insect bites, usually red, sometimes white in the center.

Septicemic plague is caused by horizontal and direct transmission. Horizontal transmission is the transmitting of a disease from one individual to another regardless of blood relation. Direct transmission occurs from close physical contact with individuals, through common air usage, from direct bite from a flea or an infected rodent. Most common rodents may carry the bacteria and so may Leporidae such as rabbits:

Significant carriers of the bacteria in the United States include:
- Rats
- Prairie dogs
- Squirrels
- Chipmunks
- Rabbits
- Fleas

The bacteria are cosmopolitan, mainly in rodents in all continents except Australia and Antarctica. The greatest frequency of human plague infections occurs in Africa. The bacteria most commonly appear in rural areas and wherever there is poor sanitation, overcrowding, and high rodent populations in urban areas. Outdoor activities such as hiking, camping, or hunting where plague-infected animals may be found, increase the risk of contracting septicemic plague, and so do certain occupations such as veterinary or other animal-related work.

Diagnosis

A doctor or veterinarian will perform a physical exam which includes asking about the medical history and possible sources of exposure. The following possible test could include:
 Blood samples (detecting antibodies)
 Culture samples of body fluids (check for the bacteria Yersinia pestis)
 Kidney and liver testing
 Checking lymphatic system for signs of infection
 Examining body fluids for abnormal signs
 Checking for swelling
 Checking for signs of dehydration
 Checking for fever
 Checking for lung infection

Prevention 

The following steps and precautions should be used to avoid infection of the septicemic plague:
 Caregivers of infected patients should wear masks, gloves, goggles and gowns
 Take antibiotics if close contact with infected patient has occurred
 Use insecticides throughout house
 Avoid contact with dead rodents or sick cats
 Set traps if mice or rats are present around the house
 Do not allow family pets to roam in areas where plague is common
 Flea control and treatment for animals (especially rodents)

Treatment

Starting antibiotics early is a first step in treating septicemic plague in humans. One of the following antibiotics may be used:
 Streptomycin
 Gentamicin
 Tetracycline or Doxycycline
 Chloramphenicol
 Ciprofloxacin

Lymph nodes may require draining and the patient will need close monitoring.

In animals, antibiotics such as tetracycline or doxycycline can be used. Intravenous drip may be used to assist in dehydration scenarios. Flea treatment can also be used. In some cases euthanasia may be the best option for treatment and to prevent further spreading.

Prognosis 
Untreated septicemic plague is almost always fatal. Early treatment with antibiotics reduces the mortality rate to between 4 and 15 percent. Death is almost inevitable if treatment is delayed more than about 24 hours, and some people may even die on the same day they present with the disease.

Epidemiology 

In 2015, Taylor Gaes, a 16-year-old in Larimer County in northern Colorado, contracted septicemic plague and subsequently died after being bitten by a flea that had bitten a rodent on his family's rural property. Only three people in Colorado had contracted the bacteria in the previous thirty years.

History 

Septicemic plague was the least common of the three plague varieties that occurred during the Black Death from 1348 to 1350 (the other two being bubonic plague and pneumonic plague). Like the others, septicemic plague spread from East Asia through trade routes on the Black Sea and down to the Mediterranean Sea.

Major port cities and trade centers such as Venice and Florence were hit the hardest. The massive loss of working population in Europe following the Black Death, resulting in increased economic bargaining power of the serf labour force, was a major precipitating factor for the Peasants' Revolt of 1381.

Other animals 

Septicemic plague is a zoonosis, a disease that generally is acquired by humans from animals, such as rodents and carnivores. Goats, sheep and camels also may carry the bacteria. Cats rarely develop clinical signs but can be infected. Areas west of the Great Plains of North America are one region where plague-infected animals commonly occur.  Plague-infested animals are found in many other countries as well, especially in developing countries where health controls are not effective.

Animals that commonly carry plague bacteria are largely rodents and Leporidae, but carnivores sometimes also become infected by their prey. Prey animals are not immune to the disease, and outbreaks of various strains of plague, such as sylvatic plague, have on occasion devastated populations of black-tailed prairie dogs and black-footed ferrets.

Plague has been active in black-tailed prairie dog populations since the 1960s. In the United States outbreaks only occur in the western States and they are devastating, with mortality rates near 100% because the animals have no immunity to the plague. Survivors are the ones that happened not to become infected and colonies that recover from a plague outbreak remain at risk.

Because black-footed ferrets prey on black-tailed prairie dogs, wild ferret populations also fall victim to sylvatic plague. An outbreak can kill nearly 100% of ferrets in a population, and surviving ferrets commonly face starvation because the prairie dogs are their main prey. Spray-and-vaccinate campaigns have aimed at preventing the spread of the plague among these animals.

Similar septicemic problems occur in many countries across the world, especially in developing countries where spending on health systems is very low and health controls are not effective.

References 

Insect-borne diseases
Plague (disease)
Zoonotic bacterial diseases

de:Pest#Pestsepsis